Bojan Samardžija (born 5 December 1985) is a Bosnia and Herzegovina cross-country skier. He competed in the men's 15 kilometre classical event at the 2006 Winter Olympics.

References

1985 births
Living people
Bosnia and Herzegovina male cross-country skiers
Olympic cross-country skiers of Bosnia and Herzegovina
Cross-country skiers at the 2006 Winter Olympics
People from Sokolac
Serbs of Bosnia and Herzegovina